
Bithia or Bitia was a Phoenician, Carthaginian, and Roman town located near Chia in the extreme south of Sardinia, Italy. Most of the ruins have been submerged underwater.

History
Bithia was founded by the Phoenicians in the 8th centuryBC as Bitan ("Palace"). It fell under Carthaginian control until the Punic Wars, when it became Roman. Punic culture survived well into the Roman period. It was abandoned in the early 7th century, when the population fled inland to escape Arab raids.

In 1963, following heavy storms, some ruins of the city came to light. Still observable are the remains of a Punic temple on the island of Cardolinu, on which are also found artifacts that seem to indicate the presence of a tophet. Additional remains of houses and a second temple dedicated to Bes are located at the foot of the promontory on which stands the Spanish tower called "Chia", the current name of the modern village.

References

Citations

Bibliography 
 . 
 . 

Phoenician colonies in Italy
Former populated places in Sardinia
Archaeological sites in Sardinia